Great Denmark Street (also called Denmark Street Great) is a street in Dublin, Ireland. It leads to Mountjoy Square, is crossed by Temple Street/Hill Street, and is part of Gardiner Row.

History 
The area was largely a semi-rural area until the 1770s, when a number of townhouses were built for the landed gentry. The street was part of Gardiner Row until 1792. The street was possibly named after the sister of George III in 1775; Caroline Matilda had married the Danish king Christian VII in 1766, divorced in 1772 and died in 1775, or after the husband of Queen Anne, Prince George of Denmark. The "Great" in the name distinguishes it from Little Denmark Street, a lane off Henry Street that ceased to exist in 1976 due to the construction of the Ilac Centre.

Occupants

Dillon Cosgrave mentions in his book North Dublin, City and County that there was once a private school situated at No. 2 which was run by Reverend George Wright and attended by Charles Lever, the novelist, and that the school were fierce competitors of another private school at Grenville Street. At No.3 was the home of the notorious judge John Toler, 1st Earl of Norbury, known as "The Hanging Judge". It is now the home of several art and cultural organisations such as Fishamble: The New Play Company and the Olivier Cornet Gallery. The O'Reilly Theatre is situated on Great Denmark Street. Michael O'Donovan, Director of the National Concert Hall (2016-2019), was born in Number 15, the Belvedere Pharmacy.

Belvedere College 
One of the most notable landmarks on the street is Belvedere House. It was built as a townhouse in 1775 for George Rochfort, 2nd Earl of Belvedere at a cost of £24,000. In 1841 it became a Jesuit college, Belvedere College. It is allegedly haunted by the ghost of Rochfort's mother, Mary Molesworth, 1st Lady of Belvedere, who died there.

As the college expanded in the 20th century, Georgian houses to the right of Belvedere House were demolished. In April 1968, the college published a planning application notice in newspapers with plans to demolish two houses to the left of the college due to "structural defects". Both had been listed for preservation, one having been the home of the 18th century stuccodore, Michael Stapleton, with a surviving interior from him. The same month, the houses were demolished prematurely and illegally. The houses were replaced with a pastiche extension designed by Jones and Kelly. The college demolished another Georgian house on the street, number 9, in 1982 as part of an extension to the school playground.

References

Bibliography

1770s establishments in Ireland
Transport infrastructure completed in the 1770s
Streets in Dublin (city)
Caroline Matilda of Great Britain